Crossing-the-bridge noodles is a rice noodle soup originating from the Yunnan province of China. It is one of the best-known dishes in Yunnan cuisine.

Description
Crossing-the-bridge noodles have over a century  of history and are listed as an intangible cultural heritage of Kunming city in 2008 to promote Yunnan food culture. The dish is served with a large bowl of boiling hot broth and soup. The soup is made with chicken, pork bone and seasoning, such as Chinese star anise and ginger. A layer of chicken fat is also used to insulate the soup and keep it warm for longer. These ingredients are separated. The soup ingredients are served on a cutting board or plate and include raw vegetables and lightly cooked meats.  Common ingredients include thin slices of turkey, chunks of chicken, chicken skin, strips of bean curd sheets, chives, sprouts and rice noodles.  Once added into the broth, it cooks quickly with a layer of melted chicken fat and oil glistening on top.  The soup takes a few minutes to cook, and it is then spooned out into small bowls. Jim Thurman of LA Weekly writes that "with the rice noodles and fresh chicken, it's reminiscent of an extremely subtle version of Vietnamese pho ga [chicken pho]. Which shouldn't surprise anyone, as Yunnan shares a border with Vietnam."

In Yunnan, various small shops sell “crossing bridge rice noodle” that comes to the table in large bowls  already mixed. At these places, it is a quick, cheap, filling lunch type of food.

Etymology

One story that has gained traction begins with a scholar who was studying hard for his imperial exams on a small island.  His wife, who would bring him food, found that by the time she had crossed the bridge to the island the soup would be cold and the noodles were soggy.  She then decided to load a large earthen pot with boiling broth with a layer of oil on top that would act as insulation and keep the broth warm.  The noodles and other ingredients were kept in a separate container, and when she arrived, she mixed the two containers together for a warm soup.

Another claim regarding the origin of the name comes from the way the ingredients are transferred between containers.  The process is similar to crossing a bridge between bowls, and hence it is called "crossing-the-bridge" noodles.

There are reportedly many other variations on the origin of the name.

Varieties

The main ingredient of the noodles is rice. Rice vermicelli production differs in different regions. In Kunming and Yunnan, there are two varieties: "dry paste" and "sour paste". The production process differs depending on individual preferences and tastes. "Sour paste", as the name suggests, tastes a little sour, but is characterized by a relatively thick and soft rice noodle. The "dry paste" does not have the sourness of the sour paste, and the noodle is relatively thin and more rigid. Older people in Kunming think the "sour paste" noodles are more authentic. Most people in Yunnan think the Kunming noodle does not satisfy their taste buds, and generally believe Mengzi County and Jianshui County makes better noodles.

Now, as people's tastes change, all kinds of noodle varieties are flooding onto the market. Kunming people now do not necessarily pick a "dry paste" or "sour paste." At present, people prefer the more efficient, slippery "water-washed rice noodle" and "purple rice noodle", one that is mixed with purple rice.

Status

The development of crossing-the-bridge noodles has changed people's eating habits over the years, especially breakfasts. Generally in street markets, the hot fresh rice noodle is put into a bowl of boiling water for about half a minute and then colored sauce is added to the bowl. This is known as the "hat" of the sauce. Crossing-the-bridge noodles served in markets in the morning are usually completed in one minute.

There are a few franchised restaurants which serve more intricate or elaborate crossing-the-bridge noodle dishes.

Ingredients
The general ingredients of guoqiao mixian include raw quail eggs, ham slices, chicken slices, and colored vegetables.

Crossing-the-bridge noodles are generally served first with a bowl of boiling hot soup. The attendants will then be on the other side of the bowl and put the ingredients into the bowl, generally in order from raw to cooked: meat first, then quail eggs, and then vegetables. Finally, they perform the noodle "crossing" with chopsticks and the dish is ready to be consumed.  The amount of oil, chili, vinegar, and soy sauce one puts in the bowl varies according to personal taste.

See also

 List of Chinese soups
 List of noodle dishes
 List of snack foods
 List of soups
 Mixian (noodle)

References

Yunnan cuisine
Chinese noodle dishes
Chinese rice dishes
Chinese soups
Noodle soups